The second inauguration of Manuel L. Quezon as the second president of the Philippines and the first president of the Philippine Commonwealth occurred on December 30, 1941. The inauguration marked the beginning of the second term of Quezon as President and Sergio Osmeña as Vice President.

References 
 

1941 in the Philippines
Presidency of Manuel L. Quezon
Quezon, Manuel